The eighth season of Bake Off Brasil premiered on August 6, 2022, at  on SBT.

This season marks the debut of Giuseppe Gerundino as a judge, replacing Olivier Anquier, who left the show following production of the second season of Bake Off Celebridades.

Bakers 
The following is a list of contestants:

Results summary

Key

Technical challenges ranking

Key
  Star Baker
  Eliminated

Ratings and reception

Brazilian ratings
All numbers are in points and provided by Kantar Ibope Media.

References

External links 

 Bake Off Brasil on SBT

2022 Brazilian television seasons